Charles Parks Richardson (born July 5, 1971) is an American doctor, an inventor, and serial entrepreneur.

Education 
Richardson received a B.S. degree in chemistry from Winston-Salem State University in Winston-Salem, North Carolina. He  has an M.D. degree from Central America Health Sciences University School of Medicine. He holds an MBA from the University of South Carolina's Moore School of Business.

Career
Richardson co-founded the company Cleveland Heart in January 2007. The company's medical technology focuses on total heart replacement and ventricular assist devices,

Richardson co-founded IntelliServices Inc. and was its CEO in January 2000. The company offers remote electronic medical records. Its product CareLink allowed medical providers to wireless monitor implanted medical devices via the Internet. The company was sold and is now owned by Medtronic.

In 2004, Richardson founded TransWorld Med. He also serves as the company chairman.

In 2007, Richardson founded TransWorld Kidney Corporation.

Richardson is founder and chairman of Cleveland Heart, a partnership between Cleveland Clinic and TransWorld Med to develop mechanical cardiac circulatory assist devices and artificial hearts.

Inventions
Richardson created IntelliPhysician, a piece of software based on the same paperless principles as IntelliHeart, but handles a wider range of business-related processes, such as scheduling, accounts receivable, financial history, and billing. The software also processes insurance claim forms and gathers and stores patients’ clinical data, including procedure and diagnosis history, email, hospital rounds information, and referring physician information. The company behind IntelliPhysician was acquired in 2006 by H-Quotient Inc. of Vienna, VA for $7.6m.

One of TransWorld Heart Corp.'s inventions is the Soul Mate. This product is an implantable device that can replace routine post-transplant heart biopsies. The Soul Mate was the first device to offer remote monitoring of congestive heat failure and allows physicians to track a patient's condition from home.

In 2007 Richardson developed the SideKick, a system for real-time monitoring of a kidney after a transplant.

References 

University of South Carolina alumni
Winston-Salem State University alumni
1971 births
Living people
American health care chief executives